Samuel Kirk (February 15, 1793 – July 6, 1872) was an American silversmith, active in Baltimore, Maryland, and best known for his introduction of repoussé to the United States. He engaged in various partnerships with his sons under the names of S. Kirk and Son and S. Kirk and Sons. In 1979 S. Kirk & Son was purchased by the Stieff Company, which renamed itself Kirk Stieff.

Kirk was born in Doylestown, Pennsylvania, apprenticed in 1810 to James Howell in Philadelphia, and partnered from 1815 to 1820 with John Smith in Baltimore with their shop at 212 Market Street (later known as 106 Baltimore Street). On March 18, 1817, he married Albina Powell. He then worked from 1820 to 1826 in his own practice at 30 Baltimore Street, then from 1826 to 1830 at 140 Baltimore Street, and from 1831 to 1846 at 144 Baltimore Street. During this early period Kirk introduced to America a chased floral repoussé pattern for silverware, probably inspired by East India silversmiths, which is still known generically as "Baltimore Silver." From 1846 onwards he partnered with his children: from 1846 to 1861 with Henry Child Kirk as S. KIRK & SON; from 1861 to 1868 with Henry Child, Charles Douglas, and Edwin Clarence Kirk as S. KIRK & SONS; from 1868 to 1870 with Henry Child Kirk as S. KIRK & SON; and again from 1870 to 1896 with Henry Child Kirk and Henry, Jr. as S. KIRK & SON (which continued after his death). The company was renamed S. Kirk & Son Inc. from 1924 to 1932, and then S. Kirk & Son STERLING from 1932 onwards.

Kirk's work includes two silver cups for General Lafayette to commemorate his visit to Baltimore, President James Monroe's flatware service for his daughter's wedding, and a 48-piece dinner service for the USS Maryland that illustrates almost two hundred scenes from Maryland's history. His work is collected in the Metropolitan Museum of Art, Dallas Museum of Art, and the De Young Museum,

References 
 The Story of the House of Kirk, 1914.
 Samuel Kirk and Son: American Silver Craftsmen Since 1815, Samuel Kirk & Son, Montclair Art Museum, 1972.
 WorldCat identity
 "Samuel Kirk and Son", The Stieff Company, with much history and many marks.
 "Samuel Kirk Maker's Marks", 925-1000.com.
 "Samuel Kirk", American Silversmiths.
 "Samuel Kirk & Son", Silver Salon Forums.
 "America’s Silversmith", Doyle.
 The Jewelers' Circular-Weekly, Volume 78, Issue 1, February 5, 1919, page 315.

American silversmiths